Boston Legal is an American legal drama-comedy (dramedy) created by David E. Kelley, which was produced in association with 20th Century Fox Television for ABC. The series aired from October 3, 2004, to December 8, 2008.

Boston Legal is a spin-off of long-running Kelley series The Practice, following the exploits of former Practice character Alan Shore (James Spader) at the legal firm of Crane, Poole & Schmidt. During the course of the series, 101 episodes of Boston Legal aired over five seasons.

Series overview

Episodes

Season 1 (2004–05)

Season 2 (2005–06)

Season 3 (2006–07)

Season 4 (2007–08)

Season 5 (2008)

References

External links

 

Boston Legal
Episodes